The Exclusive Men of the Year Africa Awards are a set of awards established in 2015 to honour and celebrate eminent men exclusively. The awards are presented annually. It is usually occasioned with the period around Fathers Day.

Notable winners

2016 
 2016 Man Of The Year (Entertainment) / Best Entertainer - Michael Owusu Addo (Sarkodie)
 2016  Man of the Year (Communication)- Nathan Kwabena Adisi (Bola Ray) 
 2016  Rising star award (Special Award) - Kofi Amoa-Abban

2017 
 2017  Rising Star Award  (Special Award) -Nana Kwame Bediako
 2017 Ultimate Man Of The Year (The Flagship Award) – Dr. Kwabena Duffour
 2017 Man Of The Year (Entertainment) Joe Mettle

2018 
 2018 Ultimate Man of the Year - Togbe Afede XIV
 2018 Icon/Legend of Entertainment  - Daddy Lumba

2019 
 2019 Discovery of the Year - Kofi Genfi (Founder of Mazzuma)
 2019 Man of the Year (Sports) - Ezekiel Nana Ziggy Ansah
 2019 The Pav Ansah Communicator Award - Giovani Caleb

2020 
 2020 Man of the Year Entertainment - Clemento Suarez
 2020 Ultimate Man of the Year-  Ernest Bediako Sampong
 2020 Lifetime Achievement Award - Prof. Emeritus Stephen Adei
 2020 Humanitarian Award - Rev. Fr. Andrew Campbell
 2020  Female category of the Young Achiever’s Award - Beryl Agyekum Ayaaba

2022 
 2022  Ultimate Man of the Year - Ibrahim Mahama
 2022  Man of the Year  (Africa) - Dr. Akinwumi Ayodeji Adesina
 2022 Man of the Year (Sports) - Benjamin Kwaku Azamati
 2022 Young Achiever (Female) - Audrey Maame Esi Swatson
 2022 Lifetime Achievement -  Joe Lartey
 2022 Actor of the year - Adjetey Anang
 2022 Woman of the Year - Elsie Effah Kaufmann
 2022 Continental Music Icon - Michael Collins Ajereh
 2022 Continental Film Icon -  Richard Mofe Damijo
 2022 Media Excellence  - Ayodele Animashaun
 2022 Young Achiever (Male) - Richie Mensah

References 

Awards established in 2015
Ghanaian awards
African awards